Davao de Oro's 2nd congressional district is a congressional district for the House of Representatives of the Philippines in the province of Davao de Oro. It was created ahead of the 1998 Philippine House of Representatives elections by the same republic act of July 19, 1997 that established the province initially named Compostela Valley. The district encompasses two noncontiguous areas of Davao de Oro: Laak in the Davao–Agusan Trough and the valley and coastal municipalities adjoining the provincial capital of Nabunturan, namely Mabini, Maco, Mawab and Pantukan. Much of these areas were previously within Davao del Norte's 2nd district. Ruwel Peter S. Gonzaga of the PDP–Laban currently serves as this district's representative in the 19th Congress, the first under the province's new name of Davao de Oro.

Representation history

Election results

2022

2019

2016

See also
Legislative districts of Davao de Oro

References

Congressional districts of the Philippines
Politics of Davao de Oro
1998 establishments in the Philippines
Congressional districts of the Davao Region
Constituencies established in 1998